Comrades is a 1986 British historical drama film directed by Bill Douglas and starring an ensemble cast including Robin Soans, Phil Davis, Keith Allen, Robert Stephens, Vanessa Redgrave and James Fox. Through the pictures of a travelling lanternist, it depicts the story of the Tolpuddle Martyrs, who were arrested and transported to Australia in 1834 for trying to improve their conditions by forming an early form of trade union. It was Bill Douglas's last film.

Cast
In credits order:

 Robin Soans as George Loveless, leader of the Tolpuddle Martyrs
 William Gaminara as James Loveless, George Loveless's younger brother
 Stephen Bateman as Old (Tom) Standfield
 Philip Davis as Young (John) Standfield, Old Standfield's son
 Jeremy Flynn as James Brine
 Keith Allen as James Hammett
 Alex Norton as Lanternist, Sergeant Bell, Diorama Showman, Laughing Cavalier, Wollaston, Ranger, Tramp, Sea Captain, McCallum, Silhouettist, and Mad Photographer
 Michael Clark as Sailor
 John Lee as Juggler 
 Arthur Dignam as Fop, Hammett's master in New South Wales
 James Fox as William Norfolk, (fictitious) Governor of New South Wales
 John Hargreaves as Convict
 Michael Hordern as Mr Pitt, campaigner for the Martyrs' freedom
 Freddie Jones as Vicar of Tolpuddle
 Murray Melvin as Frampton's Clerk
 Vanessa Redgrave as Mrs Violet Carlyle, owner of a New South Wales sheep station
 Robert Stephens as James Frampton, Squire of Tolpuddle
 Barbara Windsor as Mrs Wetham, owner of a Dorchester print shop
 Imelda Staunton as Betsy Loveless, wife of George Loveless
 Katy Behean as Sarah Loveless, wife of James Loveless
 Amber Wilkinson as Hetty Loveless, daughter of George Loveless
 Patricia Healey as Mrs Brine, mother of James Brine
 Shane Downe as Joseph Brine, younger brother of James Brine
 Sandra Voe as Diana Standfield, wife of Old Standfield, mother of Young Standfield
 Valerie Whittington as Elvi Standfield, daughter of Old Standfield, younger sister of Young Standfield
 Harriet Doyle as Charity Standfield, daughter of Old Tom Standfield, younger sister of Young Standfield
 Patrick Field as John Hammett, brother of James Hammett, the village carpenter
 Heather Page as Bridget Hammett, wife of John Hammett
 Joanna David as Mrs Frampton
 Trevor Ainsley as Gentlemen Farmer #1
 Malcolm Terris as Gentlemen Farmer #2
 Dave Atkins as Frampton's Foreman
 Alex McCrindle as Jailor
 Shane Briant as Official in New South Wales
 Lynette Curran as Prostitute in New South Wales
 Symon Parsonage as Charlie, a teenage convict
 Anna Volska as Woman in White at Auction

Production
The film had a very long and troubled production. Although Bill Douglas had the screenplay ready in 1980, it took six years to complete it, due to problems of filming in England and Australia, Douglas's perfectionism, and conflicts with his first producer, Ismail Merchant. Parts of the film were shot in the ghost town of Tyneham in south Dorset which was taken over by the military during WWII for use as a training area and is still part of a large military range.

Release
The film was first shown at the Southampton Film Festival in February 1986. It was also shown at the London Film Festival in 1986, and entered into the 37th Berlin International Film Festival in February 1987. In August 1987 it was released in British cinemas.

After a short run in cinemas, followed by a VHS release in 1989, the film was largely forgotten. However, 20 years later Bill Douglas' small but significant production was reappraised, and in 2009 the British Film Institute released a restored version of Comrades on DVD, followed in early 2012 by a three-disc dual format DVD and Blu-ray box set.

Reception
The film has been described as "a moving, magical poem of human dignity, decency and hope". Sheila Rowbotham praised the film as a "poetic and painterly work which was also a vigorous challenge to Thatcherism" and complimented Gale Tattersall's cinematography, while also identifying various flaws deriving "from the grandeur of Douglas's cinematic ambition".

References

External links
 
 
 
  
400 Blows, 18 October 2005: Simon Relph on Bill Douglas Retrieved 2012-11-07
400 Blows, 26 July 2005: Phil Davis on Bill Douglas Retrieved 2012-11-07

1986 films
1980s historical drama films
Films directed by Bill Douglas
British historical drama films
Films set in 1834
Films set in Dorset
Films set in colonial Australia
Films set in New South Wales
Drama films based on actual events
Films about the labor movement
1986 drama films
1987 drama films
1987 films
1980s English-language films
1980s British films